Asalebria imitatella is a species of snout moth in the genus Asalebria. It was described by Ragonot, in 1893, and is known from Russia.

The wingspan is about 22 mm.

References

Moths described in 1893
Phycitini
Moths of Asia